Ghulam Murtaza (born 10 March 1980) is a Pakistani first-class cricketer who played for Hyderabad cricket team.

References

External links
 

1980 births
Living people
Pakistani cricketers
Hyderabad (Pakistan) cricketers
Place of birth missing (living people)